Kingston Presbyterian Church is a historic Presbyterian church located at Conway in Horry County, South Carolina. The sanctuary was built in 1858 and is an outstanding example of antebellum Greek Revival ecclesiastical design. The three-bay façade features a portico set on square columns with recessed panels and square pilasters.  It was originally sheathed with weatherboard, but was covered in stucco in 1930 when a stuccoed brick addition was added to the rear. Also on the property is a Colonial Revival style brick educational building built in 1956.  It is co-located with the Kingston Presbyterian Church Cemetery, listed on the National Register of Historic Places in 1986.

It was listed on the National Register of Historic Places in 2009.

Gallery

References

External links
 Kingston Presbyterian Church Conway, SC website

 

Churches on the National Register of Historic Places in South Carolina
Greek Revival church buildings in South Carolina
Colonial Revival architecture in South Carolina
Presbyterian churches in South Carolina
Churches completed in 1858
19th-century Presbyterian church buildings in the United States
Churches in Horry County, South Carolina
National Register of Historic Places in Horry County, South Carolina
Buildings and structures in Conway, South Carolina